St. Vitus' Abbey on the Rott (Kloster Sankt Veit an der Rott) was a Benedictine monastery in the municipality of Neumarkt-Sankt Veit in the district of Mühldorf in Bavaria, Germany.

It was founded in 1121 by the nobleman Dietmar of Lungau, and dissolved during the secularisation of Bavaria in 1802. Formerly in the diocese of Salzburg, the abbey was a member of the Benedictine Salzburg Congregation from 1641 until its dissolution.

The premises were given at first to the Damenstift of St. Anna in Munich, but in 1829 came into the possession of the Saxon Baron Maximilian von Speck-Sternburg and then in 1858 were sold to Count Maximilian von Montgelas.

External links
 Kloster in Bayern: St. Veit

Monasteries in Bavaria
Benedictine monasteries in Germany
1120s establishments in the Holy Roman Empire
1121 establishments in Europe
Religious organizations established in the 1120s
Christian monasteries established in the 12th century
1802 disestablishments